Terence William Curran (29 June 1940 – May 2000) was an English professional football inside forward who played in the Football League for Brentford.

Career statistics

References

1940 births
English footballers
English Football League players
Brentford F.C. players
People from Staines-upon-Thames
Association football inside forwards
Tottenham Hotspur F.C. players
Kettering Town F.C. players
Corby Town F.C. players
Sittingbourne F.C. players
Southern Football League players
2000 deaths